Wynn Mountain is located in the Lewis Range of Glacier National Park, in the U.S. state of Montana. Wynn Mountain rises above the south shores of Lake Sherburne. The mountain is named for Frank B. Wynn, physician and scientist who was killed while attempting to climb nearby Mount Siyeh on July 27, 1927.

Geology

Like other mountains in Glacier National Park, the peak is composed of sedimentary rock laid down during the Precambrian to Jurassic periods.

Climate
Based on the Köppen climate classification, the peak is located in an alpine subarctic climate zone with long, cold, snowy winters, and cool to warm summers. Temperatures can drop below −10 °F with wind chill factors below −30 °F.

See also
 Mountains and mountain ranges of Glacier National Park (U.S.)

References

Wynn
Wynn
Lewis Range
Mountains of Montana